Kevin Antonio Joel Gislain Mirallas y Castillo (born 5 October 1987), known as Kevin Mirallas, is a Belgian professional footballer who plays as a winger for Cypriot side AEL Limassol.

Mirallas started his professional career in France with Lille and Saint-Étienne before moving to Greece with Olympiacos in 2010. Mirallas enjoyed success during his time at Olympiacos, scoring 34 goals in 52 league games. He was top scorer in his second season with Olympiacos with 20 goals in 25 games. His impressive performances attracted the attention of Everton F.C., who signed him in the summer of 2012 for £6 million.

Mirallas has 60 caps for Belgium since his senior debut in 2007. He has represented Belgium at various youth levels and has featured for them at senior level at the 2008 Olympics as well as the 2014 FIFA World Cup.

Club career

Early career
Mirallas spent his youth career playing for his hometown club, Standard Liège. He then left Belgium and began his first team career in France with Lille OSC in the 2004–05 season. Mirallas participated in the UEFA Cup in his first season at Lille. Mirallas was transferred to AS Saint-Étienne for €4 million, and made a name for himself by scoring against Lyon on his debut in the Rhone-Loire derby.

Olympiacos
In June 2010, Mirallas joined Greek club Olympiacos on a one-year loan for a fee of €2.5 million. Mirallas made his debut in a 5–0 win against KS Besa Kavaje in the Second Qualifying Round of the UEFA Europa League Qualifiers and scored his first two goals for the club in a 3–1 home win against Olympiakos Volos. Mirallas scored in a 2–1 away loss to their greatest rivals Panathinaikos in the Derby of the eternal enemies, after which his contract was extended to four years. Olympiacos won that season's Greek Super League and Mirallas finished as the club's top scorer with 14 goals, with only Panathinaikos's Djibril Cissé scoring more league goals. The following season Mirallas scored his first ever hat-trick for Olympiacos in a 4–0 away win against Levadiakos F.C. and scored four in a 7–2 victory over Asteras Tripolis. Olympiacos again won the league, and Mirallas was the league's top scorer with 20 goals.

Everton
In August 2012, Mirallas joined Premier League club Everton for a reported fee of £6 million. He made his debut as a second-half substitute during a 3–1 league win over Aston Villa at Villa Park in which he had a headed goal disallowed after he was ruled offside. In his first start four days later, Mirallas scored twice and provided two assists as Everton won 5–0 against Leyton Orient in the second round of the League Cup. He scored his first league goal on 22 September 2012, in a 3–0 away win against Swansea City after heading in his initial effort which rebounded off the underside of the bar. Mirallas suffered a number of injuries that limited his playing time during the middle part of the season. He made a number of brief cameos, notably against Tottenham Hotspur in December. Mirallas' next goal came against Oldham Athletic in a 3–1 win on 26 February 2013 in the fifth round of the FA Cup. He then scored his second league goal of the season against Reading in a 3–1 win on 2 March 2013. He scored his first league brace in David Moyes' last home game in charge of Everton, a 2–0 win against West Ham United.

Mirallas scored and assisted a goal during a 3–3 draw in the first Merseyside derby of the 2013–14 season on 23 November. He also received a booking for a high challenge on Luis Suárez, which opposing manager Brendan Rodgers described as reckless and insisted Mirallas was lucky to remain on the pitch. He went on to score eight goals before suffering a season-ending groin injury in April. Mirallas created 61 chances for his teammates during the season, the most of any Everton player.

On 18 September 2014, Mirallas scored his first European goal for Everton in a 4–1 win over Wolfsburg in the first match of their Europa League campaign. He signed a new three-year contract with the club in August 2015.

Mirallas scored his 29th Premier League goal for Everton on 11 March 2017 as Everton cruised to victory over West Bromwich Albion at Goodison Park in a 3–0 win. On 12 May 2017, Mirallas signed a new three-year contract deal with Everton until the end of June 2020.

Loans
On 7 January 2018, Mirallas agreed to return to former club Olympiacos on loan until the end of the 2017–18 season. The club did not have an option to purchase Mirallas as part of the contract. On 16 April, Mirallas scored a stunning strike from the edge of the penalty area on the stroke of half-time in a 5–1 home win against Kerkyra. On 4 May, his loan spell was terminated by mutual consent due to Everton's high asking price to purchase Mirallas outright, as well as Mirallas' overall subpar performances with Olympiacos.

On 4 August 2018, Mirallas signed for Fiorentina on a season-long loan deal with the option to make the transfer permanent.

Antwerp
Mirallas joined Royal Antwerp on a free transfer in August 2019.

Gaziantep 
On 5 October 2020, Mirallas joined Turkish Süper Lig club Gaziantep.

Moreirense 
On 24 January 2022, Mirallas joined Moreirense on a free transfer until the end of the 2021–22 season.

AEL Limassol 
On 23 July 2022, Mirallas joined AEL Limassol for the 2022–23 season.

International career

Mirallas has represented Belgium at under-17, under-19 and under-21 level, and was one of the leading figures in guiding the under-21s to the semi-finals of the 2007 UEFA European Under-21 Football Championship.

He scored twice in the 2008 Summer Olympics football tournament, once against China (2–0 victory) and once against Italy (3–2 victory).
He made his full international debut for the senior team in 2007 and scored his first ever international goal against Serbia in Brussels on 23 August of that year, as a Mousa Dembélé brace helped the Red Devils to a 3–2 home victory.

Mirallas was part of the Belgian squad which reached the quarter-finals at the 2014 FIFA World Cup. He made his tournament debut in the second group match, a 1–0 win over Russia at the Maracanã, as a 75th-minute substitute for Dries Mertens. In a game of few opportunities, Mirallas hit the post with Belgium's first shot on target. Another substitute, Divock Origi, scored the game's only goal two minutes from full-time.

In May 2018, Mirallas was left out of Belgium's preliminary squad for the 2018 World Cup in Russia.

Style of play
Mirallas was deployed as a centre forward for Olympiacos, but after his move to Everton he has been deployed mainly as a winger or a free-roaming forward. He is known for his pace, close ball control, passing ability and proficiency in one-on-one situations.

Personal life
Mirallas' father was born in Spain.

Career statistics

Club

International

Scores and results list Belgium's goal tally first, score column indicates score after each Mirallas goal.

Honours
Olympiacos
Super League Greece: 2010–11, 2011–12
Greek Cup: 2011–12

Royal Antwerp
Belgian Cup: 2019–20

Individual
 UEFA European Under-21 Championship Team of the Tournament: 2007
Super League Greece Top Goalscorer: 2011–12 (20 goals)
Super League Greece Player of the Season: 2011–12
Super League Greece Foreign Player of the Season: 2011–12
BBC Goal of the Month: May 2013

References

External links

Belgium Stats at Belgian FA

1987 births
Living people
Belgian footballers
Belgian expatriate sportspeople in France
Belgian expatriate sportspeople in Greece
Belgian expatriate sportspeople in England
Belgian expatriate sportspeople in Italy
Belgian expatriate sportspeople in Turkey
Belgian expatriate sportspeople in Portugal
Belgian expatriate sportspeople in Cyprus
Lille OSC players
AS Saint-Étienne players
Olympiacos F.C. players
Everton F.C. players
ACF Fiorentina players
Royal Antwerp F.C. players
Gaziantep F.K. footballers
Moreirense F.C. players
AEL Limassol players
Belgium youth international footballers
Belgium under-21 international footballers
Belgium international footballers
Ligue 1 players
Super League Greece players
Premier League players
Serie A players
Süper Lig players
Primeira Liga players
Cypriot First Division players
Belgian people of Spanish descent
Belgian expatriate footballers
Expatriate footballers in France
Expatriate footballers in Greece
Expatriate footballers in England
Expatriate footballers in Italy
Expatriate footballers in Turkey
Expatriate footballers in Portugal
Expatriate footballers in Cyprus
Footballers at the 2008 Summer Olympics
Olympic footballers of Belgium
Footballers from Liège
Association football wingers
2014 FIFA World Cup players
Belgian Pro League players